Cristóbal de la Cerda y Sotomayor, (México 1585? – † ? ); Spanish oidor, lawyer of the Real Audiencia of Chile. After the death of governor Lope de Ulloa y Lemos he assumed the temporary governance of Chile for eleven months, between December 1620 and November 1621.

Sources

Royal Governors of Chile
1580s births
17th-century deaths
Viceroyalty of Peru people